Baffin Region may refer to:

 Baffin Region, Nunavut, a census division of Nunavut, and as the Qikiqtaaluk Region an administrative region
 Baffin Region, Northwest Territories, a  region of the Northwest Territories until 1999, with similar but non-coterminal boundaries to the above